Omar Abdulaziz may refer to:

Omar Abdel Aziz, Nigerian squash player, (born 1983)
Omar Abdulaziz (footballer), Saudi footballer, (born 1983)
Omar Abdul Aziz, Nigerian footballer,  (born 1985)
Omar Abdulaziz Al-Sonain, Saudi footballer, (born 1995)
Omar Abdulaziz (vlogger), Saudi dissident vlogger living in exile in Montreal, Canada